Rob Davis may refer to:

 Rob Davis (musician) (born 1947), guitarist and songwriter
 Rob Davis (gridiron football) (born 1968), American gridiron football long snapper
 Rob Davis (politician), Canadian politician in Ontario
 Rob Davis (comics), British comics artist, writer, and editorial illustrator

See also
 Robbie Davis (born 1961), racing jockey
 Robert Davis (disambiguation)
 Rob Davies (disambiguation)